The 2022 Alabama State Treasurer election took place on November 8, 2022, to elect the Alabama State Treasurer. Incumbent Republican Party Treasurer Young Boozer, who previously served in the office from 2011 to 2019, was appointed to the position October 1, 2021 after the previous treasurer, John McMillan, resigned. Boozer won a full term.

Republican primary

Candidates

Nominee
Young Boozer, incumbent state treasurer

Endorsements

Libertarian convention

Candidates

Nominee 
Scott Hammond, former Treasurer of the Libertarian Party of Alabama

General election

Results

See also
2022 Alabama elections

References

State Treasurer
Alabama
Alabama State Treasurer elections